Aly Lotfy Mahmoud (6 October 1935 – 27 May 2018) was an Egyptian politician and prime minister. 

He was minister responsible for finance from 1978 to 1980. He served as Prime Minister of Egypt from 4 September 1985 to 9 November 1986.

References

External links
 Aly Lotfy Mahmoud in his capacity as University Professor, Video Excerpt (Arabic)

1935 births
2018 deaths
20th-century prime ministers of Egypt
Prime Ministers of Egypt
Finance Ministers of Egypt
People from Faiyum Governorate